The channeled pebblesnail, scientific name †Somatogyrus wheeleri, was a species of very small freshwater and brackish water snails that have an operculum, aquatic gastropod mollusks in the family Hydrobiidae.

This species was endemic to the United States. Its natural habitat was rivers.

References

Somatogyrus
Extinct gastropods
Gastropods described in 1915
Taxonomy articles created by Polbot